David W. Conde, or William David Wellwood Conde, (1906-1981) was an American author, journalist, and film censor who worked in occupied Japan.

Born in Ontario, Canada, he became a naturalized American citizen in 1932. From October 1945 to July 1946, he served as the director of the Motion Picture Department of the Civil Information and Education Section (CIE) in the occupation government of Japan. From 1946 to 1947 he reported on the Tokyo War Crimes Trial as a Reuters journalist. In 1947, he was forced by MacArthur's government to return to the United States. He later worked as a foreign correspondent in Tokyo, and wrote several books about Asian and American politics.
 He died in Oakland, California in 1981.

During his time heading CIE's Motion Picture Department, Conde was tasked with promoting democratic and anti-militaristic films. Much of his recognition comes from this role in early post-war Japanese cinema. Conde was known to be left-leaning and a union supporter, and has been linked to the Toho labor disputes at Toho studios. His expulsion from Japan in 1947 may have been related to suspicions that he was a communist.

References 

American journalists

1906 births
1981 deaths